Friend Me is an unaired American television comedy series about the real-life deal-of-the-day website coupon service company Groupon. The series, created by writers Alan Kirschenbaum and Ajay Sahgal, was to have been produced by CBS Television Studios but subsequently never aired after Kirschenbaum's suicide. It was confirmed as canceled on July 29, 2013, and remains unaired as of 2023.

Plot
The series follows two twenty-something guys who move to Los Angeles to start their new lives working at Groupon. While one is determined to recreate himself in the new city, the other clings to their old group of friends in Bloomington, Indiana.

Cast
 Christopher Mintz-Plasse as Evan
 Nicholas Braun as Rob
 Amanda Lund as Amanda
 Tim Robinson as Sully
 Haysha Deitsch as Steve
 Dan Ahdoot as Farhad
 Parvesh Cheena as Mike

Production
CBS placed a series order in May 2012. The series was expected to premiere as a midseason entry during the 2012–13 television season. However, on December 6, 2012, CBS revealed that its midseason schedule did not include the series. The series would be the last project for co-creator Alan Kirschenbaum, who died of suicide on October 26, 2012.

References

American comedy television series
English-language television shows
Television series by CBS Studios
Television shows set in Los Angeles
CBS original programming
Unaired television shows